Allullostunnaru is a 1984 Telugu film directed by K. Vasu. The film stars Chandra Mohan, Chiranjeevi, Sulakshana and Geetha in important roles.  The story was remade in Hindi as Andaz Apna Apna and was again made in Telugu as Veedevadandi Babu. Later many times this story was copied in many languages and again in Hindi also as Joru Ka Ghulam and Jodi No. 1. The music was composed by K. V. Mahadevan.

Plot
Chandram (Chandra Mohan) and Gopi (Chiranjeevi) are close friends. Chandram is a poor orphan. Gopi is the son of a rich man Basava Raju (Padmanabham). They have no aim in life and they spend life in parks and pubs. Basava Raju sends Gopi to the house of his friend Mangapati (Prabhakar Reddy) in Madras (now Chennai). Gopi and Chandram go to Madras. Gopi sends Chandram as Gopi to Mangapati's house. Mangapati is a rich affluent person and has a daughter Radha (Sulakshana).
Chandram and Radha fall in love. Gopi meets Sita (Geetha). Her brother Simhachalam (Chalam) is a drunkard. Gopi clears Sita's loans and they fall in love. Later the two pairs are united.

Cast
Chandra Mohan as Chandram
Chiranjeevi as Gopal Krishna "Gopi"
Sulakshana as Radha
Geetha as Sita
Chalam as Simhachalam
Prabhakar Reddy as Mangapati
Padmanabham as Basava Raju
Giri Babu as Giri
Silk Smitha

Soundtrack
"Nee Choopu Choopu Kadu" - 
"Muchchata Teerchara" -
"Cheeraku Chengandam" -
"Muddaina Poddaina" -

External links

1982 films
Films scored by K. V. Mahadevan
1980s Telugu-language films
Films directed by K. Vasu